The Ontario Handweavers & Spinners (OHS) is a non-profit organization based in Ontario, Canada that helps individuals interested in the fiber crafts to communicate and develop their skills, including weaving, spinning and dying, basket makers, braiders, tablet weavers and paper makers. The OHS communicates to its members through a quarterly newsletter, Fibre Focus, provides educational programs in spinning and weaving, provides scholarships and organizes several seminars or conferences each year.

History
On 8–9 April 1955 a meeting of 135 members of Ontario weaving guilds was held at the Heliconian Club. The noted New York weaver Berta Frey gave a talk and demonstrated putting on a multicolored warp. The group formed an advisory committee to look into setting up a provincial organization, leading to the foundation of the Ontario Handweavers and Spinners the next year.
At the time there was increasing interest in reviving traditional craft skills.

In 1986 the Handweavers Guild of America held Convergence '86 in Toronto, Canada, its first biennial meeting outside the U.S. 
The conference was co-hosted by the Ontario Crafts Council and the Ontario Handweavers & Spinners.
About 2,000 weavers and spinners attended the conference.
By 1998 the organization had grown to over 1,000 members, in over 70 guilds within six autonomous regions in Ontario. The OHS is affiliated with the Ontario Crafts Council. Many individuals prominent in the fiber arts have graduated from OHS courses or have been associated with the OHS over the years.

Associated guilds
Many local handweaving and spinning guilds in Ontario are members of the OHS, including 
Burlington Weavers and Spinners
Cambridge Spinners and Weavers
Etobicoke Handweavers and Spinners
Great Pine Ridge Spinners 
Guelph Handweavers and Spinners
Haliburton County Handweavers
Heritage Weavers and Spinner's Guild
Kingcrafts
Kingston Handloom weavers and Spinners Guild
Kitchener Waterloo Weavers' & Spinners' Guild
Leamington District Weavers Guild
London District Weavers and Spinners
Mississauga Handweavers and Spinners Guild
Nottawasaga Handweavers and Spinners Guild
Ottawa Valley Weavers' and Spinners' Guild
Oxford Weavers and Spinners
Peterborough Handweavers and Spinners
Pottawatomi Guild of Spinners and Weavers of Grey and Bruce Counties
Sarnia HandWeavers and Spinners
Southwestern Ontario Basketry Guild
Strathroy Pioneer Treadlers Spinners and Weavers
Sudbury and District Weavers and Spinners Guild
Thunder Bay Weavers Guild
Toronto Guild

References

Arts organizations established in 1956
Canadian weavers
Culture of Ontario
Organizations based in Ontario
Spinning
Textile arts of Canada
Textile arts organizations